Ostenocaris is a Jurassic species of giant Thylacocephalan crustacean, sufficiently distinct from its relatives to be placed in its own family, Ostenocarididae. It is believed to be a bethonic animal and one of the most important necrophagus animals of its environment.

Distribution

Ostenocaris lived during the Sinemurian age of the Lower Jurassic), and has been found in rocks at two sites in the Italian Lombardische Kieselkalk Formation. This formation is known for its good preservation, with fossils of annelids, fishes, and plants.

References

Thylacocephala
Jurassic crustaceans
Monotypic arthropod genera
Fossils of Italy